The 2023 Toronto mayoral by-election is to be held to elect the mayor of Toronto to serve the remainder of the 2022–2026 city council term following the resignation of Mayor John Tory. Pending confirmation by council, the by-election has been tentatively scheduled by the city clerk for Monday, June 26, 2023.

On February 10, 2023, Mayor Tory announced his intention to step down. On February 15, 2023, Tory submitted the formal letter of resignation of office to the city clerk, to be effective February 17, 2023, at 5p.m. EST. Once the office of mayor becomes vacant, Toronto City Council is required to arrange for a by-election, with the deputy mayor assuming limited mayoral powers granted by council until a permanent successor is elected.

Background 
Tory was first elected in the 2014 mayoral election, and was re-elected in 2018 and 2022. On February 10, 2023, the Toronto Star sent a series of questions to the mayor regarding a relationship he had with a female staffer in his office during the COVID-19 pandemic. Tory confirmed the allegations, admitting to making a "serious error in judgement". Later in the day, Tory announced his intention to resign as mayor of Toronto. Following the passage of the budget on February 15, Tory confirmed that he would officially resign on February 17. Deputy Mayor Jennifer McKelvie will perform the duties of the mayor's office until a permanent successor is elected.

Allies of Tory including city councillors Jon Burnside, Frances Nunziata and Gary Crawford had urged him to stay as mayor, and not resign the post. Premier Doug Ford and the Toronto Police Association also encouraged him not to resign.

By-election process 
Under the City of Toronto Act, Toronto City Council must declare the office of mayor vacant following Tory's resignation. Within 60 days, a by-law must be passed to set up a by-election. A nomination period for candidates occurs, lasting a minimum of 30 and maximum of 60 days after the formal declaration of a by-election and ends 45 days before the election. The by-election is projected to cost the city approximately $13 million to run.

The City Clerk's Office announced that it would recommend the nomination period open on April 3, 2023, and close on May 12, with the by-election will be held on June 26. The dates are tentative pending council approval during its March 29-31 session.

Candidates

Declared 
Blake Acton, retired police officer and fourth-place finisher in the 2022 mayoral election.
Ana Bailão, former deputy mayor of Toronto (2017–2022) and former city councillor for Davenport (2010–2022). 
Chloe Brown, third-place finisher in the 2022 mayoral election.
Kevin Clarke, perennial candidate and ninth-place finisher in the 2022 mayoral election.
Frank D'Angelo, entrepreneur in the food, restaurant and entertainment industries.
Rob Davis, former  TTC vice-chair and city councillor for Ward 28 – York Eglinton (1997-2000).
Giorgio Mammoliti, former city councillor for York West (2000–2018), former New Democratic MPP for Yorkview (1990–1995).
Gil Peñalosa, runner-up in the 2022 mayoral election and urbanist.
 Knia Singh, lawyer and human rights activist, twelfth-place finisher in the 2022 mayoral election.  
 Chris Sky, former property developer, conspiracy theorist, and anti-lockdown activist.

Potential 
Brad Bradford, city councillor for Beaches—East York (2018–present).
Alejandra Bravo, city councillor for Davenport (2022–present).
Celina Caesar-Chavannes, former Liberal member of Parliament (MP) for Whitby (2015–2019).
Olivia Chow, third-place finisher in the 2014 Toronto mayoral election and former New Democratic MP for Trinity—Spadina (2006–2014) 
Josh Colle, former city councillor for Eglinton—Lawrence (2010–2018) and former chair of the Toronto Transit Commission (2014–2018). 
Michael Coteau, Liberal MP for Don Valley East (2021–present), former provincial cabinet minister (2013–2018).
Stephen Holyday, city councillor for Etobicoke Centre (2014-present).
Mitzie Hunter, MPP for Scarborough—Guildwood (2013–present), Minister of Advanced Education and Skills Development (2018), Minister of Education (2016–2018).
Josh Matlow, city councillor for Toronto—St. Paul's (2010–present)
Mark Saunders, former chief of the Toronto Police Service (2015–2020) , Progressive Conservative candidate for Don Valley West during the 2022 Ontario election.
Kristyn Wong-Tam, New Democratic MPP for Toronto Centre (2022–present) and former city councillor for Toronto Centre-Rosedale (2010–2022).

Declined 
Stan Cho, provincial associate minister of transportation (2021–present) and Progressive Conservative MPP for Willowdale (2018–present).
Michael Clemons, general manager of the Toronto Argonauts and Canadian Football Hall of Famer.
Joe Cressy, senior vice president at George Brown College, former city councillor for Spadina—Fort York (2014–2022).
Nathaniel Erskine-Smith, Liberal MP for Beaches—East York (2015–present).
Doug Ford, 26th premier of Ontario and Progressive Conservative MPP for Etobicoke North (2018–present), runner-up in the 2014 mayoral election, former city councillor for Etobicoke North (2010–2014).
Ahmed Hussen, federal minister of housing and diversity and inclusion (2021–present) and Liberal MP for York South—Weston (2015–present).
Bhutila Karpoche, New Democratic MPP for Parkdale—High Park (2018–present).
Jennifer Keesmaat, former chief city planner (2012–2017) and runner-up in the 2018 mayoral election.
Mike Layton, former city councillor for Ward 11 University—Rosedale (2018–2022) and Ward 19 Trinity—Spadina (2010–2018).
Marco Mendicino, federal minister of public safety (2021–present) and Liberal MP for Eglinton—Lawrence (2015-present).
Jennifer McKelvie, deputy mayor of Toronto (2022–present) and city councillor for Scarborough—Rouge Park (2018–present).
Denzil Minnan-Wong, former deputy mayor of Toronto (2014–2022) and former city councillor for Don Valley East (1998–2022).
Rod Phillips, former provincial minister of long-term care (2021–2022), minister of finance (2019–2020), minister of the environment, conservation and parks (2018–2019), Progressive Conservative MPP for Ajax (2018–2022).
Kathleen Wynne, 25th premier of Ontario (2013–2018), former Liberal MPP for Don Valley West (2003–2022).

Polling 

Note: Forum percents scaled by 707/1042 to correct for undecided column and data consistency with other polls

References 

Mayoral elections in Toronto
2023 in Toronto
Toronto